Buypass AS is an ETSI-certified certificate authority (CA) issuing SSL certificates, enterprise certificates and Person ID based on the PKI standard. The company was founded in Norway in 2001.

Buypass is registered with the Norwegian Communications Authority as an issuer of qualified certificates under the Norwegian Electronic Signature Act. Buypass is also registered as a provider of electronic identification and related identification services under Certificate Authorities and requirements specifications for PKI in the public sector. This is a prerequisite for supplying identifications solutions and services to the public sector. Buypass is one of the major providers in Norway in this category.

In March 2018, Buypass became the first commercial CA to offer free ACME certificates under the branding Buypass SSL Go.

Solutions
 SSL/TLS-certificates – European Certificate Authority (CA) – issuing SSL certificates worldwide.
 Including SSL-certificates with Extended Validation (EV). 
 Buypass is a member of CA/Browser Forum.
 Offers free server certificates via the ACME protocol.
 Personal electronic ID (Buypass ID) – including PKI – for smart cards and mobile. Provides access to government services, web-services and VPNs. Patented operator independent mobile authentication and payment option.
 Enterprise Certificates
 Multi Factor Authentication
 Payment Options for web and mobile.

References

Certificate authorities
Companies based in Oslo
Computer companies of Norway